The 2015 Towson Tigers football team represented Towson University in the 2015 NCAA Division I FCS football season. They were led by seventh-year head coach Rob Ambrose and played their home games at Johnny Unitas Stadium. They were a member of the Colonial Athletic Association. They finished the season 7–4, 5–3 in CAA play to finish in a three-way tie for fourth place.

Schedule

References

Towson
Towson Tigers football seasons
Towson Tigers football